Michael Bull (born 11 September 1946, Belfast, Northern Ireland) is a retired male pole vaulter and decathlete from Northern Ireland. He set his personal best in the pole vault (5.25 metres) on 22 September 1973 at a meet in London.

Career
Bull first achieved success in 1966, winning silver for the pole vault at the Commonwealth Games. Then in 1970, he won gold at the Commonwealth Games. He appeared in 69 internationals for Great Britain and Northern Ireland and captained the team on numerous occasions. In 1991, he won the World Masters (over 40) pole vault in Finland.

Upon retirement from professional athletics, Bull lectured on sports studies and provided sports commentary for UTV (Ulster Television). He opened his own gym in Dufferin Avenue, Bangor, County Down (Northern Ireland), Mike Bull's Health Gym (now Paul's Gym), and was a fitness adviser for the Irish Rugby Football Union.

Honours
In 2012, Dr Mike Bull was awarded the OBE by the Queen for services to sport and charity.

In 2014, Mike Bull was awarded the accolade of "Britain's Greatest Ever Pole-vaulter" in World renowned athletics magazine Athletics Weekly by leading statistician Mel Watman.

Achievements

References

External links
 Michael Bull Track & Field statistics

Sportspeople from Belfast
Decathletes from Northern Ireland
Male pole vaulters from Northern Ireland
Athletes (track and field) at the 1966 British Empire and Commonwealth Games
Athletes (track and field) at the 1970 British Commonwealth Games
Athletes (track and field) at the 1974 British Commonwealth Games
Athletes (track and field) at the 1978 Commonwealth Games
Commonwealth Games gold medallists for Northern Ireland
Commonwealth Games silver medallists for Northern Ireland
Commonwealth Games medallists in athletics
Athletes (track and field) at the 1968 Summer Olympics
Athletes (track and field) at the 1972 Summer Olympics
Olympic athletes of Great Britain
1946 births
Living people
Medallists at the 1966 British Empire and Commonwealth Games
Medallists at the 1970 British Commonwealth Games
Medallists at the 1974 British Commonwealth Games